Clemmons is a surname. It may refer to one of the following people:

 Abel Clemmons (1772–1806), American murderer
 Alan D. Clemmons (born 1958), American lawyer and politician
 Beth Clemmons, a fictional character from the CBS crime drama Criminal Minds
 David Judson Clemmons, American guitarist, singer, and songwriter
 François Clemmons (born 1945), American singer, actor, playwright, and university lecturer
 Jessica Clemmons (born 1981), American singer-songwriter
John Ray Clemmons (born 1977), American member of the Tennessee House of Representatives
 Joseph Clemmons (born 1929), American politician
 Larry Clemmons (1906–1988), American animator, screenwriter, and voice actor
 Maurice Clemmons (1972–2009), American responsible for the November 29, 2009, murder of four police officers in Parkland, Washington
Sarah Clemmons, American college administrator

See also 
 Clemons (surname)
 Clemens